The Women's Long Jump at the 1988 Summer Olympics in Seoul, South Korea had an entry list of 32 competitors, with two qualifying groups (32 jumpers) before the final (12) took place on Thursday September 29, 1988.

Records
These were the standing World and Olympic records (in metres) prior to the 1988 Summer Olympics.

The following Olympic records were set during this competition.

Summary
This was a showdown of the top three female long jumpers of all time, then and remaining now. All three had held the world record. Galina Chistyakova had set the still standing world record just a few months earlier, breaking up a log jam. Heike Drechsler had set the world record, improved it to 7.45m two years earlier and subsequently equalled her record two weeks later. Chistyakova's Soviet teammates Yelena Belevskaya and Inessa Kravets were the #5 and #7 jumpers of all time. Joyner-Kersee was the reigning world champion and had set the Olympic record at 7.27m the day before en route to her still standing world record in the heptathlon. She had to qualify for this final in the midst of that heptathlon.

Battling swirling winds, Drechsler opened with a 6.92m, followed by Joyner-Kersee upping the ante to 7.00m, then as the final jumper of the sequence, Chistyakova opened with 7.11m to take the first round lead.  In the second round, Drechsler improved to 7.06m.  After a JJK foul, Belevskaya took the third position with a 7.04m.  Chistyakova showed up for her second round jump with her jumping knee wrapped.  Her second round jump was tentative and almost 4 feet inferior of her world record.  Drechsler took over the lead with her third round 7.18m, a distance only 9 women in history had ever achieved, but five of them were in the competition.  Joyner-Kersee answered with a 7.16m to take over silver position and push Belevskaya out of the medals.

Drechsler extended her lead to 7.22m in the fourth round.  On advice from her coach and husband Bob Kersee, Joyner-Kersee moved her marks back and went for broke in the fifth round, the result was the  winner and new Olympic record.  While Drechsler was able to answer with two commendable efforts, she was unable to improve.  Later that same afternoon, she raced to a bronze medal in the 200 metres, behind Joyner-Kersee's sister in law, Florence Griffith Joyner's still standing world record.

Final

Non-qualifiers

See also
 1987 Women's World Championships Long Jump (Rome)
 1990 Women's European Championships Long Jump (Split)
 1991 Women's World Championships Long Jump (Tokyo)

References

External links
  Official Report

T
Long jump at the Olympics
1988 in women's athletics
Women's events at the 1988 Summer Olympics